Gary Chirimuuta (born 16 July 1991) is a Zimbabwean first-class cricketer who plays for Mountaineers cricket team. In December 2020, he was selected to play for the Mountaineers in the 2020–21 Logan Cup.

References

External links
 

1991 births
Living people
Zimbabwean cricketers
Mountaineers cricketers
Sportspeople from Harare